Thermowells are cylindrical fittings used to protect temperature sensors installed in industrial processes. A thermowell consists of a tube closed at one end and mounted in the process stream. A temperature sensor such as a thermometer, thermocouple, or resistance temperature detector is inserted in the open end of the tube, which is usually in the open air outside the process piping or vessel and any thermal insulation. Thermodynamically, the process fluid transfers heat to the thermowell wall, which in turn transfers heat to the sensor. Since more mass is present with a sensor-well assembly than with a probe directly immersed into the process, the sensor's response to process temperature changes is slowed by the addition of the well. If the sensor fails, it can be easily replaced without draining the vessel or piping. Since the mass of the thermowell must be heated to the process temperature, and since the walls of the thermowell conduct heat out of the process, sensor accuracy and responsiveness is reduced by the addition of a thermowell.

Traditionally the thermowell length has been based in the degree of insertion relative to pipe wall diameter. This tradition is misplaced as it can expose the thermowell to the risk of flow-induced vibration and fatigue failure. When measurement error calculations are carried out for the installation, for insulated piping or near ambient fluid temperatures, excluding thermal radiation effects, conduction error is less than one percent as long as the tip is exposed to flow, even in flanged mounted installations.

The response time of the installed sensor is largely governed by the fluid velocity and considerably greater than the response time of the sensor itself. This is the result of the thermal mass of the thermowell tip, and the heat transfer coefficient between the thermowell and the fluid.

Arguments for longer designs are based on traditional notions but rarely justified. Long thermowells may be used in low velocity services or in cases where historical experience justified their use. In modern high strength piping and elevated fluid velocities, each installation must be carefully examined especially in cases where acoustic resonances in the process are involved.

A representative thermowell is machined from drilled bar stock to ensure a proper sensor fit (ex: an 0.260-inch bore matching an 0.250-inch sensor). A thermowell is typically mounted into the process stream by way of a threaded, welded, sanitary cap, or flanged process connection. The temperature sensor such as a thermometer, thermocouple, or resistance temperature detector is inserted in the open end of the thermowell and typically spring-loaded to ensure that the outside tip of the temperature sensor is in metal to metal contact with the inside tip of the thermowell. The use of welded sections for long designs is discouraged due to corrosion and fatigue risks.

Materials and construction
The thermowell protects the instrument from the pressure, flow-induced forces, and chemical effects of the process fluid. Typically a thermowell is made from metal bar stock. The end of the thermowell may be of reduced diameter (as is the case with a tapered or stepped-shank thermowell) to improve the speed of response.

For low pressures and temperatures, Teflon may be used to make a thermowell; various types of stainless steel are typical, with other metals used for highly corrosive process fluids.

Where temperatures are high and the pressure differential is small, a protection tube may be used with a bare thermocouple element. These are often made of alumina or other ceramic material to prevent chemical attack of the platinum or other thermocouple elements. The ceramic protection tube may be inserted into a heavy outer protection tube manufactured from silicon carbide or other material where increased protection is required.

Flow forces
Thermowells are typically installed in piping systems and subject to both hydrostatic and aerodynamic forces. Vortex shedding is the dominant concern for thermowells in cross-flow applications and is capable of forcing the thermowell into resonance with the possibility of fatigue failure not only of the thermowell but also of the temperature sensor. The conditions for flow-induced resonance generally govern the design of the thermowell apart from its pressure rating and materials of construction. Flow-induced motion of the thermowell occurs both in-line with and transverse to the direction of flow with the fluid forces acting to bend the thermowell. In many applications the transverse component of the fluid forces resulting from vortex shedding tends to govern the onset of flow-induced resonance, with a forcing frequency equal to the vortex shedding rate. In liquids and in high-pressure compressible fluids, a smaller but nonetheless significant component of motion in the flow-direction is also present and occurs at nearly twice the vortex shedding rate. The in-line resonance condition may govern thermowell design at high fluid velocities although its amplitude is a function of the mass-damping parameter or Scruton number describing the thermowell-fluid interaction.

The aerodynamic force coefficients and the dependence of the shedding rate are dependent on the so-called tip Reynolds number.
for Reynolds numbers less than 100000 (the Critical Reynolds Number), the shedding forces are well behaved and lead to periodic forcing. For Reynolds Numbers associated with the Drag Crisis (first reported by Gustav Eiffel) 100,000 < Rd < 1,000,000-3,000,000, the shedding forces are randomized with a corresponding reduction in magnitude. The random fluctuations are characterized by their Fourier Spectra characterized by its Strouhal Bandwidth and the root mean square magnitudes of the aerodynamic force coefficients in the lift and drag directions.

For drilled bar-stock thermowells, the most common form of failure is bending fatigue at its base where the bending stresses are greatest. In extreme flow conditions (high-velocity liquids or high-velocity, high-pressure gases and vapors) catastrophic failure may occur with bending stresses exceeding the ultimate strength of the material. For extremely long thermowells, the static component of the bending stresses may govern design. In less demanding services, fatigue failure is more gradual and often preceded by a series sensor failures. The latter are due to the acceleration of the thermowell tip as it vibrates, this motion causes the element to lift off the bottom of the thermowell and batter itself to pieces. In cases where the acceleration stresses have been measured, sensor accelerations at resonant conditions often exceed 250 g and have destroyed the accelerometer.

The natural frequencies of thermowell bending modes are dependent upon the dimensions of the thermowell, the compliance (or flexibility) of its support, and to a lesser extent dependent upon the mass of the sensor and the added mass of the fluid surrounding the thermowell.

The ASME Performance Test Code PTC 19.3TW-2016 ("19.3TW") defines criteria for the design and application of rigidly supported thermowells. However, these thermowells must be manufactured from bar stock or forged material where certain dimensional requirements and manufacturing tolerances are met. Coatings, sleeves, velocity collars, and special machined surfaces such as spirals or fins are expressly outside the scope of the 19.3TW standard.

Catastrophic failure of a thermowell due to fatigue caused the 1995 sodium leak and fire at the Monju Nuclear Power Plant in Japan. Other failures are documented in the published literature.

Standardization
The ASME PTC 19.3 TW (2016) Thermowells Standard is a widely used code for thermowells machined from bar stock and includes those welded to or threaded into a flange as well as those welded into a process vessel or pipe with or without a weld adaptor, but does not account for pipe wall flexibility or ovalization.

See also
Bending
Temperature measurement
Timoshenko beam theory
Vibration

References

Regarding measurement error and more complex thermowell installations:
Benedict, R.P, Murdock, J.W. (1963) "Steady-State Thermal Analysis of a Thermowell", ASME J. Eng. Power, July 1963, pp. 235–244

Cessac,Kevin J. (2003) "Reducing Thermowell Conduction Errors in Gas Pipeline Temperature Measurement",AIP Conference Proceedings 684, 1093 (2003); https://doi.org/10.1063/1.1627275 

More recent references involve radiation induced measurement error, sooting flames, and proximity of heat sources.

Regarding thermowell design:

ASME Performance Test Codes (2016), ASME PTC 19.3TW
Brock, James E., (1974) "Stress analysis of thermowells", Report NPS – 59B074112A, Naval Postgraduate School, Monterey California
Koves, William (2008) Question raised in PTC 19.3TW Committee meeting dealing with Brock’s support compliance and metal thickness
Porter, M.A., Martens, D.H. (2002) "Thermowell vibration investigation and analysis", ASME Press. Vessels and Piping 2002-1500, pp. 171–176
Report (2007) "Extension and update of the guidelines for the avoidance of vibration induced fatigue of process pipework, Intrusive Element Assessment", Energy Inst. Report AVIFF-2005-13, pp. 1–25
Leissa, A.W. (1973) "Vibration of Shells", NASA SP-288, pp. 32–38
Karczub, D.G. (2006) "Expressions for direct evaluation of wave number in cylindrical shell vibration studies using the Flügge equations of motion", J. Acoust. Soc. Am. 119(6), pp. 3553–3557. DOI:10.1121/1.2193814
Bijlaard, P.P. (1955) "Stresses from local loadings in Cylindrical Shells", Trans. ASME, 77, p.p. 805-816
Sanders, J. L., Simmonds, J.G.(1970) "Concentrated Forces on Shallow Cylindrical Shells", ASME J. Applied Mech., 37, pp. 367–373
Steel, C.R, Steele, M.L. (1983) "Stress Analysis of Nozzles in Cylindrical Vessels With External Load", ASME J. Press. Vessel Tech., 105, pp. 191–200
Xue, Ming-De, Li, D. F., Hwang, K.C. (2005) "A Thin Shell Theoretical Solution for Two Intersecting Cylindrical Shells Due to External Branch Pipe Moments", ASME J. Press. Vessel Tech., 127 pp. 357–368
Wais, E. A., Rodabaugh, E.C., Carter, R. (1999) "Stress Intensification Factors and Flexibility Factors for Unreinforced Branch Connections", ASME Proc. Press. Vessels and Piping, 383, pp. 159–168
Xue, L., Widera, G.E.O., Seng, Z. (2006) "Flexibility Factors for Branch Connections Subject to In-plane and Out-of-plane moments,” ASME J. Press. Vessel Tech., 128, pp. 89–94
Ming, R.S., Pan, J., Norton, N. P. (1999) "The mobility functions and their application in calculating power", J. Acoust. Soc. Am. 105(3), pp. 1702–1713
Fegeant, O. (2001) "Closed form solutions for the point mobilities of axi-symmetrically excited cylindrical shells", J. of Sound and Vibration, 243(1), pp. 89–115
Motriuk, R. W. (1996) "Verification of Two Methods to Mitigate High Frequency Pipe Shell Vibration", ASME Proc., Montreal, PVP-FIV 328, pp. 405–413
Zhou, Z. J., Motriuk, R. W. (1996) "Influence of Tapered Thermowell Length on Temperature Measurement", ASME Proc., Integrity of Structures, PVP-333, pp. 97–104
O’Donnell, W.J. (1960) "The Additional Deflection of a Cantilever Due to the Elasticity of the Support", ASME J. Applied Mech., 27(3), pp. 461–464
Brown, J.M., Hall, A.S. (1962) "Bending deflection of a circular shaft terminating in a semi-infinite body", ASME J. Applied Mech., 29(1), pp. 86–90
MacBain, J.C., Genin, J. (1973) "Natural Frequencies of a Beam Considering Support Characteristics", J. Sound and Vibration, 27 (2), pp. 197–206 
Brock, J.E. (1974) "Stress analysis of thermowells", Report NPS – 59B074112A, Naval Postgraduate School Report AD/A-001 617, Naval Postgraduate School, Monterey California
Weaver, W., Timoshenko, S.P., Young, D.H. (1990) Vibration Problems in Engineering, 5th Ed., John Wiley & Sons, New York
Han, S. M., Benaroya, H., Wei, T. (1999) "Dynamics of Transversely Vibrating Beams Using Four Engineering Theories", Journal of Sound and Vibration, 225(5), pp. 935–988
Barthoff, L.W. (1981) "Thermowell Flow-Induced Vibrations Measured in Laboratory and FFTF Plant Piping", ASME PVP Conference, DEN PVP-168, Denver Colorado
Ogura, K., Fuji, T. (1999) "Flow-induced vibration test of thermowell in secondary cooling system of the prototype FBR", 7th Intl. Conf. on Nuclear Engineering, Tokyo Japan, ICONE 7380

Regarding published failure reports:
Heffner, R.E., Gleave, S.W., Norberg, J.A. (1962) "SPERT III Thermowell Failure and Replacement", Atomic Energy Corp. Research and Development Report IDO-16741
Marten, W.F. (1973) "Thermowell Failure at Sodium Components Test Installation (SCTI)", Atomic Energy Corp. Research and Development Report, LDO-TDR-73-4
Private Communication (1984), Off-Gas Temperature Measurement Case
Permana, Yhenda (1995) "Thermowell failure as a result of vortex shedding phenomena", Vibration Institute, Proc. 19th, Annual. Meeting, pp. 55–59
Eckert, B. (2010) "Centrifugal Compressor Case Study", Gas Mach. Conf., GMC 2010
SIGTTO Report Summary (2011) "Thermowells in LNG Liquid Carrier Lines", Soc. Int'l Gas Tanker and Terminal Operators, April 2011
El Batahgry, A.M., Fathy, G. (2013) "Fatigue failure of thermowells in feed gas supply downstream pipeline at a natural gas production plant", Case Studies in Engineering Failure Analysis, 1, pp. 79–84, DOI: 10.1016/J. CSEFA 2013.04.001
Kawamura, T., Nakao, T., Hashi, M., Murayama, K., (2001), "Strouhal Number Effect on Synchronized Vibration of a Circular Cylinder in Cross Flow", JSME Series B, 44(4), pp. 729–737
Rice, S. O. (1944), "Mathematical Analysis of Random Noise", Bell Sys. Tech. J., 23, pp. 282–332
Bendat, J.S., Piersol, A. G., (1971) Random Data: Analysis and Measurement, Wiley Interscience, N.Y
Blevins, R.D., Burton, T.E. (1976), "Fluid Forces Induced by Vortex Shedding", ASME J. Fluids Eng., pp. 19–24
Jacquot, R.G. (2000) "Random Vibration of Damped Modified Beam Systems", J. Sound and Vibr., 234(3), pp. 441–454
Fung, Y.C., (1960), "Fluctuating Lift and Drag Acting on a Cylinder in a Flow at Supercritical Reynolds Numbers", J. Aerospace Sci., 27 (11), pp. 801–814
Roshko, A. (1961) "Experiments on the flow past a circular cylinder at very high Reynolds number", J. Fluid Mech., 10, pp. 345–356
Jones,G.W. (1968) "Aerodynamic Forces on Stationary and Oscillating Circular Cylinder at High Reynolds Numbers", ASME Symposium on Unsteady Flow, Fluids Engineering Div., pp. 1–30
Jones,G.W., Cincotta, J.J., Walker, R.W. (1969) "Aerodynamic Forces on Stationary and Oscillating Circular Cylinder at High Reynolds Numbers", NASA Report TAR-300, pp. 1–66
Achenbach, E. Heinecke, E. (1981) "On vortex shedding from smooth and rough cylinders in the range of Reynolds numbers 6x103 to 5x106", J. Fluid Mech. 109, pp. 239–251
Schewe, G. (1983) "On the force fluctuations acting on a circular cylinder in crossflow from subcritical up to transcritical Reynolds numbers", J. Fluid Mech., 133, pp. 265–285
Kawamura, T., Nakao, T., Takahashi, M., Hayashi, T., Murayama, K., Gotoh, N., (2003), "Synchronized Vibrations of a Circular Cylinder in Cross Flow at Supercritical Reynolds Numbers", ASME J. Press. Vessel Tech., 125, pp. 97–108, DOI:10.1115/1.1526855
Zdravkovich, M.M. (1997), Flow Around Circular Cylinders, Vol.I, Oxford Univ. Press. Reprint 2007, p. 188
Zdravkovich, M.M. (2003), Flow Around Circular Cylinders, Vol. II, Oxford Univ. Press. Reprint 2009, p. 761
Bartran, D. (2015) "Support Flexibility and Natural Frequencies of Pipe Mounted Thermowells", ASME J. Press. Vess. Tech., 137, pp. 1–6, DOI:10.1115/1.4028863   Paper No: PVT-19-1012 https://doi.org/10.1115/1.4044602 
Botterill, N. (2010) "Fluid structure interaction modelling of cables used in civil engineering structures", PhD dissertation (http://eprints.nottingham.ac.uk/11657/), University of Nottingham
Bartran, D. (2018) "The Drag Crisis and ThermowellDesign", ASME J. Press. Vess. and Piping, Vol.140/044501-1. Paper No: PVT-18-1002 https://doi.org/10.1115/1.4039882  

Regarding thermowell flow tests with and without strakes:
Bartran,Dave (2019) “Modal Analysis of Flange Mounted Thermowells”, ASME J. Press. Vessel Tech. 141(6): 064502, DOI: 10.1115/1.4044602.

External links
PTC 19.3 Committee Temperature Measurement
Thermowells For Temperature Sensors and Temperature Measurement - Courtesy of and a tribute to Raymond Peacock contribution to temperature measurement
[www.nrc.gov › docs Flow induced vibration of thermowells - NRC]

Temperature
Temperature control